= Miss AI =

International beauty pageant

- Type: International artificial intelligence beauty pageant
- First edition: 2024
- Most recent edition: 2024
- Last edition: 2024
- Current titleholder: Kenza Layli; Morocco
- Website: miss-ai.webflow.io

Miss AI was an international artificial intelligence beauty pageant run by the British company Fanvue. It is the first beauty pageant for AI-generated personas.

== History ==
Miss AI's inaugural contest was organized by Fanvue as a part of the World AI Creator Awards (WAICAs) in 2024. The winner is selected by a panel of judges which consists of both humans and AI-generated individuals.

The Moroccan "virtual influencer" Kenza Layli was crowned with the inaugural title while Lalina Valina and Olivia C remained the first and second runners-up respectively.

== Competition ==
The creators are eligible to take part in this competition as long as the models are entirely AI-generated and have a social media presence.

The judges evaluate contestants' three main categories – Beauty, Tech, & Social clout and rank them according the overall points earned from these categories. The Guardian commented that "AI models take every toxic gendered beauty norm and bundle them up into completely unrealistic package".

== Winners ==
Edition	Year	Representing	Miss AI	Developer	Note
1st	2024	Morocco	Kenza Layli	Myriam Bessa	
